The Atlas method is a method used by the World Bank since 1993 to estimate the size of economies in terms of gross national income (GNI) in U.S. dollars.

A country's GNI in local (national) currency is converted into U.S. dollars using the Atlas conversion factor, which uses a three-year average of exchange rates to smooth effects of transitory exchange rate fluctuations, adjusted for the difference between the rate of inflation in the country (using the country's GDP deflator), and that in a number of developed countries (using a weighted average of the countries' GDP deflators in SDR terms). The resulting GNI in U.S. dollars is divided by the country's midyear population to obtain the GNI per capita.

The World Bank favors the Atlas method for comparing the relative size of economies, and uses it to classify countries in low, middle and high-income categories and to set lending eligibilities, in order to reduce short-term fluctuations in country classification.

See also
List of countries by GNI (nominal) per capita
World Bank high-income economy

References

Gross domestic product
International macroeconomics
World Bank